Alexandre do Nascimento (born 1 March 1925) is an Angolan cardinal of the Catholic Church. He served as Archbishop of Luanda from 1986 to 2001 and was made a cardinal in 1983.

Biography
Born in Malanje, do Nascimento studied at the seminaries in Banglas, Malanje, and Luanda before traveling to Rome in 1948 to study at the Pontifical Gregorian University, from where he obtained his baccalaureate in philosophy and his licentiate in theology. He was ordained to the priesthood by Archbishop Luigi Traglia on 20 December 1952, and then taught dogmatic theology at the Luanda seminary and served as chief editor of the Catholic newspaper O apostolado ("The apostolate") until 1956, whence he became preacher of the cathedral.

In 1961, with the outbreak of the War of Independence, Nascimento was forced to enter exile in Lisbon. Whilst in Portugal, he did pastoral work, served as a counselor to the Movement of Teams of Our Lady, and studied civil law at the Classical University. Upon returning to Angola in 1971, he taught moral theology at the Pius XII Institute of Social Sciences, and served as an official of the archdiocesan curia of Lubango, secretary general of the Angolan Cáritas, and special assistant to students and former political prisoners.

On 10 August 1975, Nascimento was appointed the fourth bishop of Malanje by Pope Paul VI. He received his episcopal consecration on the following 31 August from Archbishop Giovanni De Andrea, with Archbishops Manuel Nunes Gabriel and Eduardo Muaca serving as co-consecrators. Nascimento was vice-president of the Angolan Episcopal Conference from 1975 to 1981, and was named the third Archbishop of Lubango on 3 February 1977. Archbishop do Nascimento was kidnapped by guerrillas during a pastoral visit on 15 October 1982; he was later freed on 16 November of that same year after Pope John Paul II made an appeal for his release.

John Paul II created him Cardinal-Priest of S. Marco in Agro Laurentino in the consistory of 2 February 1983. He preached the Lenten spiritual exercises for the Pope and members of the Roman Curia in 1984. He was appointed the thirty-fourth Archbishop of Luanda on 16 February 1986 and resigned this post on 23 January 2001.

Nascimento was unable to participate in the 2005 papal conclave because he had just turned 80. He became the oldest living member of the College of Cardinals upon the death of Cardinal Jozef Tomko on 8 August 2022.

References

External links

Cardinals of the Holy Roman Church
Catholic-Hierarchy

1925 births
Living people
20th-century Roman Catholic archbishops in Angola
Angolan cardinals
People from Malanje Province
People from Luanda
Cardinals created by Pope John Paul II
Roman Catholic archbishops of Luanda
Roman Catholic bishops of Malanje
Roman Catholic archbishops of Lubango